Song Aiqin (born 27 December 1970) is a Chinese biathlete. She competed at the 1992 Winter Olympics and the 1994 Winter Olympics.

References

External links
 

1970 births
Living people
Biathletes at the 1992 Winter Olympics
Biathletes at the 1994 Winter Olympics
Chinese female biathletes
Olympic biathletes of China
Place of birth missing (living people)
Asian Games medalists in biathlon
Asian Games medalists in cross-country skiing
Cross-country skiers at the 1990 Asian Winter Games
Biathletes at the 1996 Asian Winter Games
Asian Games gold medalists for China
Asian Games silver medalists for China
Medalists at the 1990 Asian Winter Games
Medalists at the 1996 Asian Winter Games
Universiade bronze medalists for China
Universiade medalists in biathlon
Competitors at the 1989 Winter Universiade